The West Orange Road-Thomas Bridge is located off of Township Road 144 near the intersection of West Orange Road in Delaware, Ohio. The bridge was placed on the National Register. Still standing, the bridge was closed to traffic in 2007 and replaced by the DEL-TR 114-0.00 bridge which was constructed in 2009.

References

External links

Road bridges on the National Register of Historic Places in Ohio
Buildings and structures in Delaware County, Ohio
National Register of Historic Places in Delaware County, Ohio
Bridges completed in 1898
Pratt truss bridges in the United States
Metal bridges in the United States